Ticci is a surname. Notable people with the surname include:

Camillo Pabis Ticci (1920–2003), Italian bridge player
Stefano Ticci (born 1962), Italian bobsledder

See also
Ricci
Tucci

Italian-language surnames